The 2020 The Real Heroes 400 was a NASCAR Cup Series race held on May 17, 2020, at Darlington Raceway in Darlington, South Carolina, replacing Chicagoland Speedway event. Contested over 293 laps on the  egg-shaped oval, it was the fifth race of the 2020 NASCAR Cup Series season. It was the first Darlington event held in the spring since 2014, and the first major sporting event in the United States since COVID-19 was declared a pandemic.

Report

Background

The 50th edition of this race, last held in 2004, was the first of the NASCAR Cup Series season following a hiatus brought on by the COVID-19 pandemic in the United States, beginning with the postponement of the Atlanta Motor Speedway race weekend on March 13, and subsequent postponement of all races through at least early-May. On April 30, NASCAR announced the resumption of races with twin races at Darlington, including a 400-mile race on May 17, and a 310-mile (500 kilometer) race the following Wednesday (May 20). All races will be held behind closed doors with only essential staff present, guidelines for social distancing and use of protective equipment by team staff, and logging to help with contact tracing efforts.

On May 14, NASCAR announced that the May 17 race would be branded as The Real Heroes 400; the naming was in support of The Real Heroes Project—a collaboration of major U.S. sports leagues to honor health care professionals working during the pandemic. As part of the initiative, the names of drivers printed above the cars' driver-side windows were replaced with the names of health care professionals (determined in collaboration with local Fox affiliates). The selected workers collectively served as Grand Marshals of the race via a video "mosaic".

Ryan Newman returned to racing, having recovered from injuries sustained after the final lap crash of the 2020 Daytona 500. Matt Kenseth made his return to the series, having been named the new driver of the Chip Ganassi Racing No. 42 Chevrolet, after the suspension and firing of Kyle Larson.

Entry list
 (R) denotes rookie driver.
 (i) denotes driver who are ineligible for series driver points.

 Brennan Poole competed under Premium Motorsports banner but the team is now owned by Rick Ware (also owner of the Rick Ware Racing).

Qualifying
Under modified operational procedures, no qualifying sessions were held for this race. The starting order was determined by a random draw, with drivers grouped into pots of positions based on segments of the owners' points standings going into the race.

Starting Lineup

Race

Stage Results

Stage One
Laps: 90

Stage Two
Laps: 95

Final Stage Results

Stage Three
Laps: 108

Race statistics
 Lead changes: 10 among 6 different drivers
 Cautions/Laps: 10 for 57
 Red flags: 0
 Time of race: 3 hours, 27 minutes and 21 seconds
 Average speed:

Media

Television
The Real Heroes 400 was carried by Fox in the United States. Mike Joy and seven-time Darlington winner Jeff Gordon called the race from the Fox Sports Studio in Charlotte. Regan Smith handled pit road duties. Larry McReynolds provided insight from the Fox Sports studio in Charlotte.

Radio
The Motor Racing Network (MRN) called the race for radio, which was simulcast on Sirius XM NASCAR Radio. Alex Hayden and Dave Moody called the action for MRN when the field raced down the front stretch. Dillon Welch called the race from a Billboard outside of turn 1 when the field raced through turns 1 and 2, and Steve Post called the race atop of the Darlington Raceway Club outside of turn 3 when the field raced through turns 3 and 4. Kim Coon and Hannah Newhouse called the action on pit road for MRN.

Standings after the race

Drivers' Championship standings

Manufacturers' Championship standings

Note: Only the first 16 positions are included for the driver standings.

References

Real Heroes 400
NASCAR races at Darlington Raceway
Real Heroes 400
Real Heroes 400
Real Heroes 400